The Green-Hartsfield House, also known as the Hartsfield House, is a historic home located near Rolesville, Wake County, North Carolina, a satellite town northeast of the state capital Raleigh. Built in 1805, the house is an example of Late Georgian / Early Federal style architecture.  It is a two-story, three bay, single pile, frame dwelling sheathed in weatherboard, with a two-story gable-roofed rear ell.  A one-story rear shed addition was added in the 1940s.  The house was restored between 1985 and 1987.  Also on the property is a contributing frame barn.

In December 1989, the Green-Hartsfield House was listed on the National Register of Historic Places.

See also
 List of Registered Historic Places in North Carolina

References

External links
 Detailed information about the Green Hartsfield House

Houses on the National Register of Historic Places in North Carolina
Houses completed in 1805
Federal architecture in North Carolina
Georgian architecture in North Carolina
Houses in Wake County, North Carolina
National Register of Historic Places in Wake County, North Carolina
1805 establishments in North Carolina